Events from the year 1522 in India.

Events
 22 January – Duarte de Menezes becomes governor of Portuguese India (until 1524)

Births
 4 August – Maharana Udai Singh, king of Mewar and the founder of the city of Udaipur, (died 1572)

See also

 Timeline of Indian history

References 

 
India
India
1520s in India
Years of the 16th century in India